The Single Track is a lost 1921 American silent melodrama film directed by Webster Campbell and starring Corinne Griffith. The film is based upon a story by Isabelle Ostrander writing under the pseudonym Douglas Grant. The film was produced and distributed by Vitagraph.

Plot
As described in a film magazine, when New York City society belle Janette Gildersleeve (Griffith) is informed by her uncle Andrew Geddes (Kent) that her property in Alaska is threatened unless a railroad line is built to other holdings, she promptly closes her town house and, under an assumed name, takes a job as a clerk at the North Star Mining Company's store at Katalak, Alaska. There she encounters civil engineer Barney Hoyt (Travers) who is in charge of building the single track line. Jim Mallison (Betz) attempts to force his attentions on Janette and Barney saves her from further annoyance. The opposition company owning the mine at Unatik attempts to destroy the tracks and a bridge on the day the right-of-way is to expire by floating a raft with dynamite against the bridge. Janette and the family butler, who is posing as her father, destroy the raft and save the bridge. They also rescue Barney who was engaged in a hand-to-hand encounter with Mallison on the trestle.

Cast
Corinne Griffith as Janette Gildersleeve
Richard Travers as Barney Hoyt
Charles Kent as Andrew Geddes
Sidney Herbert as Peddar
Jessie Stevens as Man Heaney
Edward Norton as Roland Winfield
Matthew Betz as Jim Mallison (credited as Matthew Betts)
Fuller Mellish as Jud Pettinger

References

External links

1921 films
American silent feature films
Lost American films
1921 drama films
American black-and-white films
Silent American drama films
Melodrama films
1921 lost films
Lost drama films
1920s American films